The Order of the Liberator was the highest distinction of Venezuela and was appointed for services to the country, outstanding merit and benefits made to the community. For Venezuelans the order ranks first in the order of precedence from other orders, national and foreign.

The President of Venezuela is the Chief of the Order and has the faculty of appointing. By right, he wears the Collar of the Order.

The order was created by Antonio Guzmán Blanco on September 14, 1880, and reformed in 1922 under the presidential term of Juan Vicente Gómez, the Order has as precedent the Medal of Distinction with the bust of the Liberator created on March 11, 1854 under the presidency of José Gregorio Monagas and before that, the Order of the Liberators created by Simón Bolívar in 1813.

In 2010, the National Assembly of Venezuela decided to officially abolish the order and replace it with the Order of the Liberators of Venezuela.

Grades 
 Collar
 First Class (Grand Cordon)
 Second Class (Grand Officer)
 Third Class (Commander)
 Fourth Class (Officer)
 Fifth Class (Knight)

Recipients

Collars 
  Juan Carlos I of Spain, (former King of Spain)
  Rafael Correa, (former President of Ecuador)
  Soeharto, (former President of Indonesia)
  Mahmoud Ahmadinejad, (former president of Islamic Republic of Iran)

Abolishment and replacement 
In 2010, the National Assembly of Venezuela decided to officially abolish the order and replace it with the Order of the Liberators of Venezuela, a revival of the medal created by Simón Bolívar in 1813 to honor participants of the Admirable Campaign.

The new order, unlike its predecessor, has 3 classes, in ascending order:
 Arrow of the Liberators
 Lance of the Liberators
 Sword of the Liberators

The President is the order's Grand Master, and has full authority over appointments to the Order. He or she wears the collar of the Sword of the Liberators class of the order.

References 

 Gaceta Oficial de los Estados Unidos de Venezuela - Ley sobre Condecoracion de la Orden del Libertador 13 de Junio de 1922 (Spanish)

Liberator, Order of the
Liberator, Order of the
Awards established in 1880